Lindsay H. Burns is an American neuroscientist and rower who won a silver medal at the 1996 Summer Olympics. She is a senior vice president of the pharmaceutical company Cassava Sciences and married to its CEO Remi Barbier.

As of July 2022, Cassava Sciences and papers published by Burns are under investigation; Cassava denies any wrongdoing.

Personal life 
Burns was born in 1965 and raised in Big Timber, Montana. She graduated from Harvard University in 1987. In 1991, she obtained a PhD in neuroscience from University of Cambridge on a thesis titled Functional interactions of limbic afferents to the striatum and mesolimbic dopamine in reward-related processes, which was supervised by Barry Everitt and Trevor Robbins.

Burns worked as a research fellow in psychobiology at McLean Hospital in Belmont, Massachusetts. She joined Cassava Sciences in 2002 and became senior vice president of neuroscience in 2021.

Burns is married to Remi Barbier, the CEO and founder of Cassava Sciences.

Rowing career 
Burns started competitive rowing soon after entering Harvard. In 1987, she rowed in the Radcliffe varsity crew and won the Eastern Association of Women's Rowing Colleges (EAWRC) championship that awarded her the Ivy title and the EAWRC League title. She was part of the US rowing team from 1987 and from 1990–1996. Competing in the lightweight category at six World Rowing Championships, she won four medals: gold at the 1987; silvers in the double in 1990 and 1991; and bronze in the double in 1994. She won a silver medal at the 1995 Pan American Games competing in the quad sculls (heavyweight) category and she won the European Rowing Championships at Lucerne in 1995 with Teresa Bell. She was an alternate rower at the 1992 Summer Olympics in Barcelona, Spain.

She teamed up again with Teresa Bell at the 1996 Summer Olympics in Atlanta, United States, and won a silver medal in the Lightweight Double Sculls. In 2006, she was inducted into the Harvard Sports Hall of Fame. In 2016, she was inducted into the National Rowing Foundation Hall of Fame.

Scientific works 

Burns' first research was on the effect of neurokinin A on brain functions in rats. Her first paper in 1988, written with Ann E. Kelley, reported that neurokinin A in the ventral tegmental area modifies dopamine circuits to induce behavioral changes. She continued her PhD research on the role of dopamine and the limbic system. During her post-doc at McLean Hospital, she focused on neurodegenerative diseases, specifically, transplantation of pig neural cells into rat brain as a possible treatment of Parkinson's or Huntington's disease. Further research indicated possible use in humans. While working for a biotech company later acquired by Elan Pharmaceuticals, she published the effects of ziconotide in a rat model of spinal cord ischemia.

In 2005, she published a series of papers on Oxytrex and related research with ultra-low doses of certain (opioid antagonists) to enhance analgesia and prevent opioid-induced hyperalgesia, opioid tolerance and substance dependence.

Since 2006, Burns has collaborated with Hoau-Yan Wang at the City University of New York, who had been investigating Alzheimer's disease. Previously identifying filamin A (FLNA) for its role in regulating opioid receptor signaling, Burns and Wang then identified FLNA as a critical protein in enabling Abeta42's signaling through the alpha 7 nicotinic acetylcholine receptor to induce Alzheimer's disease pathology.

FLNA, simufilam and Alzheimer's disease
In 2008, Burns, Wang and Maya Frankfurt published in PLOS One a finding that the opioid antagonists naloxone and naltrexone bind with ultra-high affinity to FLNA to prevent mu opioid receptor excitatory signaling. Burns and Wang identified the binding site on FLNA and the activation of CREB by opioid receptor - Gs coupling in the same journal the next year. FLNA is a cytoplasmic protein that maintains normal cell shape and division. In 2010, Burns and Wang announced a novel analgesic" which they named PTI-609 (PTI for Pain Therapeutics, Inc., the former name of Cassava Sciences) and stated that the molecule binds to FLNA as well as activating mu opioid receptors.

In 2012, they published in The Journal of Neuroscience a novel compound PTI-125 that binds to FLNA similarly to naloxone and naltrexone. With PTI-125, they stated that FLNA aberrantly links to the alpha 7 nicotinic receptor, enabling signaling of Abeta42 to hyperphosphorylate tau.

In 2017, they reported in Neurobiology of Aging that the FLNA in Alzheimer's disease transgenic mice and human postmortem brain tissue has an altered conformation (based on a shift in isoelectric focusing) and that PTI-125 binding to altered FLNA restores its normal shape, thereby reducing tau hyperphosphorylation, amyloid deposits and tau-containing lesions in the brains of the mice. The United States Adopted Names (USAN) gave the drug name for PTI-125 as simufilam in 2020; as of 2022, it is in Phase III clinical trials.

Research controversies 

As of July 2022, Cassava Sciences and papers published by Burns and Wang are under investigation by the U.S. Justice Department; Cassava denies any wrongdoing. The U.S. Securities and Exchange Commission (SEC), the U.S. National Institutes of Health (NIH), and City University of New York (CUNY) were also investigating allegations of manipulated data.

References

External links 
 
 
 Profile at Cassava Sciences

1965 births
Living people
Rowers at the 1996 Summer Olympics
Olympic silver medalists for the United States in rowing
American female rowers
Harvard University alumni
World Rowing Championships medalists for the United States
Medalists at the 1996 Summer Olympics
Pan American Games medalists in rowing
Pan American Games bronze medalists for the United States
People from Big Timber, Montana
Alumni of the University of Cambridge
Rowers at the 1995 Pan American Games
Medalists at the 1995 Pan American Games
21st-century American women
Medical scandals